Jack Britt High School is a public high school located in southern Cumberland County, North Carolina. It is attended by approximately 2,000 students in grades nine through twelve and is a 2018 Winner of U.S. News & World Report Best High Schools Silver Medal.

Integrated Systems Technology Academy
Jack Britt, like many other schools in Cumberland County, has an academy, or a special program of study that focuses a student's education on a specific subject. The Integrated Systems Technology Academy of Engineering provides students the opportunity to study and learn technical design and engineering concepts like drafting, physics, design implementation, and imageboard creation.

Sports
Jack Britt currently has the following sports teams:
Baseball
Basketball
Bowling
Cheerleading
Cross Country
Football
Golf
Lacrosse
Soccer
Softball
Swimming
Tennis
Indoor Track and Field
Track and Field
Volleyball
Wrestling

Awards and distinctions
Jack Britt won the 2009–2010 U.S. News & World Report America's Best High Schools Bronze Medal.

NCHSAA Exemplary School. Jack Britt was commended for its overall program, including athletic opportunities and facilities, community interest and involvement, and academics.

In 2010, Jack Britt won the Educational Trust's Dispelling the Myth Award, which recognizes outstanding work in narrowing achievement gaps between student groups, exceeding state standards, and rapidly improving student learning.

Jack Britt won the 2010–2011 North Carolina Honor School of Excellence.

In 2013, Jack Britt's Marching Band, The Pride of Jack Britt, attended the USBands National Championships at MetLife Stadium winning the Dinkles Spirit of Band Award.

Jack Britt won the North Carolina 4A High School Fast Pitch Softball State Championship in 2018. This is the only school in Cumberland County to win the 4A Fast Pitch Softball Championship.

Notable alumni
 Heather Erickson  Paralympic volleyballist
 Brandon Ghee  NFL cornerback
 Marques Murrell  NFL linebacker and two-time Division I-AA national champion with Appalachian State
 Xavier Nixon  NFL offensive tackle
 Fionnghuala O'Reilly  Miss Universe Ireland 2019
 C. J. Williams (born 1990)  basketball player in the Israeli Basketball Premier League
 Jordan Williams  Canadian Football League linebacker and first overall pick in the 2020 CFL Draft
 Joshua Williams (born 1990)  NFL cornerback

References

External links
 Jack Britt High School website

2000 establishments in North Carolina
Educational institutions established in 2000
Public high schools in North Carolina
Schools in Cumberland County, North Carolina